Daniel Simon (December 18, 1918, The Bronx, New York – July 26, 2005, Portland, Oregon) was an American television writer and comedy teacher.

Biography
The older brother of playwright Neil Simon, the two siblings wrote comedy together until Neil left to write plays. Danny would wrote for television shows including Your Show of Shows, The Colgate Comedy Hour, The Phil Silvers Show, Make Room for Daddy, My Three Sons, The Carol Burnett Show, Kraft Music Hall, Diff'rent Strokes, and The Facts of Life. He later became a comedy teacher.

Quotations
Woody Allen said about Simon, "I've learned a couple of things on my own since and modified things he taught me, but everything, unequivocally, that I learned about comedy writing I learned from him".

Jimmy Boyd, "Being around Danny always makes me and everyone else happy. He is always up and positive, and he sees humor in absolutely everything. It is endless funny one-liners. In rehearsal I could read the same comedy line a hundred times, and Danny would be laughing".

Personal life and death
Simon was married to Arlene Friedman from 1953 to 1962. The couple had two children, Michael Howard Simon and Valerie Jeanne Simon (died 2009). In 2011, Michael Simon was appointed by President Barack Obama to be a judge on the United States District Court for the District of Oregon.

Danny Simon died in 2005 at age 86 at the Robison Jewish Health Center in Portland, Oregon. He had suffered a stroke.

References

External links

1918 births
2005 deaths
American television writers
American male television writers
Jewish American writers
Simon family
20th-century American screenwriters
20th-century American male writers